Bill Flanagan (born January 14, 1955) is an American author, television executive and radio host.  He was born in Rhode Island and graduated from Brown University in 1977. His books include Written in My Soul (1986), Last of the Moe Haircuts (1986), U2 at the End of the World (1995), and the novels A&R (2000), New Bedlam (2007), Evening's Empire (2010), and Fifty in Reverse (2020).

He is the screenwriter for the documentary Jimmy Carter: Rock n Roll President (August 2020) and produced Audible's best-seller Breakshot: James Taylor (2020) as well as Audible projects with St. Vincent: “St. Vincent: Words + Music” and Smokey Robinson (2020).

From 1995 until 2015 he was an executive at MTV Networks, retiring as Executive Vice President of the Viacom Music Group. As EVP/Editorial Director of MTV Networks, Flanagan oversaw the series VH1 Storytellers and CMT Crossroads.  He has also worked on VH1's Legends, VH1 Archives, Hotel MTV, and many other series and specials.  He was one of the producers of The Concert for New York City after the September 11 attacks and has produced, co-produced, or executive produced two televised concerts from the White House; The Beatles Revolution for ABC; Elvis Lives for NBC; and VH1 specials with Garth Brooks, Paul McCartney, Clint Eastwood, Bruce Springsteen, and Oprah Winfrey.

Flanagan currently hosts four series on Sirius XM Radio Channels - Flanagan's Wake on Tom Petty Radio, Written In My Soul on Volume, and The Fab Fourum and Northern Songs on the Beatles Channel.

Flanagan acts as Ombudsman of the Sundance Channel series Spectacle: Elvis Costello with.... He also appears on air as an essayist on CBS News Sunday Morning.

He has written for Rolling Stone, The New York Times, Esquire, Spy, Men's Journal, Vanity Fair, GQ, Commonweal, The New Yorker, and The Village Voice.

References

Further reading
"A conversation with author Bill Flanagan". Charlie Rose. August 28, 2007
Evening's Empire: A Novel. Amazon.com.
"A conversation between Bill Flanagan and Bob Dylan".  March 22, 2017 
"MTV's Bill Flanagan On Jackson's Music". CBS News. June 30, 2009
Smith, Ethan. "Day in the Life: Behind the Music". New York. June 26, 2000
Sisario, Ben. "The Day the Music Died". The New York Times. February 25, 2010
"Bill Flanagan". Slate. June 5, 2000
Flanagan, Bill. "Up Close & Personal with GRAMMY Winning Producer Steve Lillywhite". Grammy365. January 19, 2010

Living people
20th-century American novelists
American television executives
1955 births
Brown University alumni
American writers about music
21st-century American novelists
American male novelists
20th-century American male writers
21st-century American male writers
20th-century American non-fiction writers
21st-century American non-fiction writers
American male non-fiction writers